Dorothee Bauer (born 11 June 1983) is a German sport shooter who competed in the 2004 Summer Olympics.

References

1983 births
Living people
German female sport shooters
ISSF rifle shooters
Olympic shooters of Germany
Shooters at the 2004 Summer Olympics